William Laurens Rathje (July 1, 1945 – May 24, 2012) was an American archaeologist.  He was professor emeritus of anthropology at the University of Arizona, with a joint appointment with the Bureau of Applied Research in Anthropology, and was consulting professor of anthropological sciences at Stanford University. He was the longtime director of the Tucson Garbage Project, which  studied trends in discards by field research in Tucson, Arizona, and in landfills elsewhere, pioneering the field now known as garbology.

Rathje received his PhD in anthropology from Harvard University in 1971.  His academic interests have been archaeology, early civilizations, modern material culture studies, and Mesoamerica.  He first became known as director of the National Geographic-sponsored Cozumel Archaeological Project (Harvard/U of Arizona: Feb–June 1973) --which established Cozumel's significance as an Olmec and Mayan port of trade.

With his students at the University of Arizona, Rathje began Le Projet du Garbàge in 1973, sorting waste at Tucson's landfill.  Early results showed that Tucson residents discarded 10 per cent of the food they purchased and that middle-income households wasted more food than the poor or wealthy.

He received the 1990 Award for Public Understanding of Science and Technology from the American Association for the Advancement of Science for "his innovative contributions to public understanding of science and its societal impacts by demonstrating with his creative 'Garbage Project' how the scientific method can document problems and identify solutions."

Except for several years in the early 2000s, during his tenure at Stanford, Rathje lived in Tucson, Arizona.

Works 
Lowland Classic Maya Socio-Political Organization Degree and Form Through Time and Space. Thesis (PhD), Harvard University, 1971
A Study of Changing Pre-Columbian Commercial Systems, with Jeremy A Sabloff and Judith G Connor, Cambridge, Mass.: Peabody Museum of Archaeology and Ethnology, Harvard University, 1975. 
"Household Archaeology." with Richard R. Wilk, American Behavioral Scientist, 25. 6 (1982): 617–39.
Household Refuse Analysis: theory, method, and applications in social science, with Cheryl K Ritenbaugh and Projet du Garbàge. Beverly Hills, Calif.: Sage Publications, 1984. OCLC 16674732
Household Garbage and the Role of Packaging: the United States/Mexico City household refuse comparison, with Michael D. Reilly and Wilson W. Hughes. Tucson, Ariz.: Solid Waste Council of the Paper Industry, 1985. OCLC: 40356239
"Rubbish," Atlantic Monthly, (1989): 1–10.
"Once and Future Landfills," National Geographic, May 1991.
Rubbish!: The Archaeology of Garbage, New York: Harpercollins, 1992. 
Use Less Stuff: Environmentalism for Who We Really Are, with Robert M Lilienfeld, New York: Ballantine Pub. Group, 1998. 
"The Perfume of Garbage: Modernity and the Archaeological." Modernism/Modernity. 11. 1 (2004): 61–83.

Notes

External links

1945 births
2012 deaths
American archaeologists
Harvard University alumni
University of Arizona faculty
Stanford University Department of Anthropology faculty